Noel Edwin Boggs (1917–1974) was an American musician who was a virtuoso on the lap steel guitar and a member of the Steel Guitar Hall of Fame. He was one of the pioneers in electric steel guitar who helped popularize the instrument beyond its native Hawaiian music into other genres of American popular music, specifically Western Swing.  Boggs played and recorded with almost every major artist in the genre including Bob Wills and His Texas Playboys (1944-1945) and Spade Cooley's Dance Band. Bob Wills' band helped define the guitar's role in western swing; Wills discovered and coached innovative guitarists who deeply influenced country, rock and jazz music. Boggs appeared on some 2000 recordings as a soloist and his playing was prominent on several of Wills’ hits that became Western swing standards, including "Roly Poly" and "Stay a Little Longer".

Early life

Born in Oklahoma City in 1917, Boggs began playing steel guitar in his youth and in 1935 was performing on three local radio stations while still in high school. At that time, the electric pickup to amplify a guitar had just been invented (1934). Boggs began playing on a Rickenbacker lap steel, the first electrified string instrument of any type. Just a month before high school graduation, he was invited to join Hank Penny's Radio Cowboys in 1937 for a southeastern U.S. tour. At that time, the electric lap steel guitar was a new musical device and Western swing became a vehicle for trying new things with the instrument. It was used to create horn-like punches and provide single-note solos, and to join fiddles and traditional guitars in three-part harmony. After the Rickenbacker, Boggs played an Epiphone double-neck steel guitar. He was one of the first steel players to switch between guitar necks in mid-solo in order to get different chord voicings.

Career

Boggs performed with Jimmy Wakely during the late 1930s.
He befriended guitar manufacturer Leo Fender in 1946 and became the owner the first product of Fender's new musical instrument company, a lap steel guitar (bearing the cursive "big F" Fender logo). Musician Billy Strange said, "Speedy [West], Noel Boggs, Jimmy Bryant, and I—the four of us would go out there [to the Fender factory] and just play around as much as we could and help them with design, and tell them the things that we wanted to see put on the instrument." Boggs' instrument of choice became the Fender Stringmaster for most of his career. He became noted for his electric steel guitar playing that popularized the instrument beyond its native Hawaiian music into other genres of American popular music, specifically Western Swing. Boggs  befriended jazz guitarist Charlie Christian whose solos Boggs transcribed to create arrangements for three guitars on songs such as "Flying Home" or "Good Enough to Keep".  Over his career, Boggs appeared on some 2000 recordings as a soloist and performed with nearly every major artist in Western Swing including Bob Wills, Spade Cooley, Bill Boyd, Tommy Duncan and Hank Penny. Boggs was featured on Penny's 1946 hit instrumental "Steel Guitar Stomp" with electric guitar played by Merle Travis. With Bob Wills, several hits featuring Boggs became standards, including "Roly Poly", "Texas Playboy Rag" and "Stay a Little Longer". 

In the early years of steel guitar, the instrument was limited to basic chords: major, minor, an occasional sixth chord. The only way to get more chords and voicings was to add additional necks to the instrument, each tuned differently.  In 1949, Fender created at triple-neck console steel for Boggs requiring a metal frame with legs to hold it. Next was Fender's quadruple neck model, delivered to Boggs on July 1, 1953, known as "Boggs' Quad". The concept of adding more necks had to stop somewhere, and that point was in the early 1950s with the invention of the pedal steel guitar . The pedals allowed playing more complex and versatile music than was possible on lap steel, According to music writer Rich Kienzle, Boggs' refusal to switch to pedal steel hindered his latter career. After leaving Spade Cooley's band 1954,  Boggs formed his own quintet, playing throughout California and Nevada as well as on USO tours. By the late 1960s, bad health slowed Boggs activity.

Boggs died August 31, 1974 (age 56) after suffering a massive stroke and heart attack.

Notes

References

Western swing performers
1917 births
1974 deaths
Steel guitarists
Musicians from Oklahoma City
20th-century American guitarists
20th-century American male musicians